The Diamond Head Theatre is a cultural institution in the United States.  Calling itself the Broadway of the Pacific, it is located on the slopes of Diamond Head in Honolulu, Hawaii.  Opened in 1915, it is Hawaii's oldest performing arts center.

History
On April 28, 1915, a new theatrical group called The Footlights was born when Will Lewers, Mrs. Walter F. Dillingham, Helen Alexander, Margaret Center and Gerrit Wilder appeared in The Amazons by Pinero. The performance took place at the Honolulu Opera House, where the main Post Office on Merchant Street now stands. The legacy of those theatre lovers grew into the third-oldest, continuously operating theatre in the entire United States.

In 1934, The Footlights reorganized and took on a new name: Honolulu Community Theatre. In the original mission statement, still honored today, the theatre committed itself to community service through the art of theatre, involving the people of Hawaii as audience members, stage crew and performers.

During World War II, Honolulu Community Theatre productions entertained thousands of troops at over 300 performances throughout the Pacific (a tradition they continued with the Pacific tour of Ain't Misbehavin' during the 1990 season). Then, in 1952, Honolulu Community Theatre took up residence in the Fort Ruger Theatre, the Army Post's then movie house. Major refurbishments to make that structure a fully modern venue for stage productions included the addition of scene and costume shops, installation of lighting and sound systems, handicapped-accessible restrooms, a first-ever lobby for patrons and an upstairs addition for expanded office space, spotlights, and sound and lighting boards.

In 1990, Honolulu Community Theatre was renamed Diamond Head Theatre. Each season Diamond Head Theatre offers six mainstage theatrical productions, including five major musicals. They provide theatre workshops to train residents of Hawaii in the theatrical arts. Acting, voice and dance classes for children, teens, and adults are offered throughout the year. Diamond Head Theatre's Shooting Stars, a youth performing arts troupe, provides exposure and training to area youth.

Past Seasons

2007-2008 Season 

The Best Little Whorehouse in Texas
September 21, 2007 – October 7, 2007

Meet Me in St. Louis
November 30, 2007 – December 16, 2007

Barefoot in the Park
February 1, 2008 – February 17, 2008

Flower Drum Song
March 21, 2008 – April 6, 2008

The Producers 
May 16, 2008 – June 1, 2008

The Wizard of Oz
July 11, 2008 – July 27, 2008

2008 - 2009 Season 

Les Misérables
A Hawaii Community Theatre Premiere
September 26, 2008 – October 12, 2008

Peter Pan
December 5, 2008 – December 31, 2008

Souvenir
A Hawaii Premiere 
January 30, 2009 – February 15, 2009

Gypsy
March 20, 2009 – April 5, 2009

Dirty Rotten Scoundrels
A Hawaii Premiere 
May 15, 2009 – May 31, 2009

The Wedding Singer
A Hawaii Premiere 
July 10, 2009 – July 26, 2009

2009-2010 Season 

The Drowsy Chaperone
A Hawaii Premiere 
September 25 – October 11, 2009 

Irving Berlin's White Christmas
A Hawaii Premiere 
December 4 – 20, 2009 

The Joy Luck Club
January 29 – February 14, 2010 

SHOUT! The Mod Musical
A Hawaii Premiere 
March 19 – April 4, 2010 

Guys and Dolls
May 14 – 30, 2010 

The Sound Of Music
July 9 – 25, 2010

References

External links
Official site

Theatres in Hawaii
Buildings and structures in Honolulu
Culture of Honolulu
Tourist attractions in Honolulu
Theatres completed in 1915
1915 establishments in Hawaii